Adriano Ferreira Silvestre (born June 10, 1979), or simply Adriano,  is a Brazilian defensive midfielder, who last played Mixto Esporte Clube.

Career

In January 2008, he moved to Portuguese side Marítimo from Paraná and then played for the club and the reserve team through 2010.

External links

 
 Adriano at ZeroZero
 placar

1979 births
Living people
Brazilian footballers
Campeonato Brasileiro Série A players
Cruzeiro Esporte Clube players
Associação Portuguesa de Desportos players
Goiás Esporte Clube players
Coritiba Foot Ball Club players
Mogi Mirim Esporte Clube players
São Paulo FC players
Esporte Clube Juventude players
Avaí FC players
Clube Atlético Juventus players
Clube Atlético Bragantino players
Paraná Clube players
C.S. Marítimo players
Association football midfielders